StatSoft is the original developer of Statistica. Dell acquired it in March 2014. Statistica is an analytics software portfolio that provides enterprise and desktop software for statistics, data analysis, data management, data visualization, data mining, which is also called predictive analytics, and quality control.

Company history
StatSoft Inc. was established in 1984 as a partnership of a group of university professors and scientists. Its first products had menu-driven libraries of flexible statistical procedures and ran on microcomputer platforms such as Apple II, CP/M, Commodore, and MS-DOS.

With the release of Statistica 9 in May 2009, both 32-bit and 64-bit native versions became available. Its current product suite, Statistica 12, was released in May 2013. Statistica is used worldwide at major corporations, government agencies, and universities.

On March 24, 2014, StatSoft was acquired by Dell in an effort to bolster Dell's ‘big data’ offering. StatSoft's CEO at the time of the Dell acquisition was Paul Lewicki.

On June 20, 2016, Dell sold Dell Software Group (which included StatSoft) to private equity firm Francisco Partners and Elliott Management.

On May 15, 2017, Quest Software sold Statistica to TIBCO Software.

StatSoft's product lines
Statistica Enterprise: the Enterprise line of Statistica products is designed for multi-user, collaborative analytic applications. Statistica Enterprise allows connections to data repositories and interactive filtering of data, contains analysis and report templates, and allows for management of security and permissions.
Web-based Applications: the Statistica Enterprise Server system includes the analytic functionality of the respective selected Statistica product or any combination of Statistica products. This system makes the functionality of any of the Statistica products available via an industry-standard Web browser.
Data Mining: each of the products in the Statistica Data Mining suite offers an icon-based user interface. It features a selection of automated and ready-to-deploy data mining solutions for a variety of business applications. Statistica is customizable and may be used to call external code modules, including R. This collection of data mining and machine learning algorithms includes: support vector machines, EM and k-means clustering, classification & regression trees, generalized additive models, independent component analysis, stochastic gradient boosted trees, ensembles of neural networks, automatic Feature Selection, MARSplines, CHAID trees, nearest neighbor methods, association rules, and random forests.
Statistica Desktop: the Statistica Desktop line of products is designed for deployment on a single workstation. Statistica spreadsheets, configurations and macros are all stored on the User's local workstation as a stand-alone application. Statistica includes general purpose statistical, graphical, and analytic data management procedures.

StatSoft’s services 
StatSoft's professional services groups provide a range of services to complement the Statistica software. StatSoft provides software integration and customization services, the development of custom Web applications based on Statistica Enterprise Server technology, as well as the installation of a general-purpose Web Server system. StatSoft also offers deployment of data mining solutions designed to work with specific data warehouses and solve particular ranges of problems. Additionally, statistical consulting services are available. StatSoft offers both introductory and advanced training courses in major cities in the United States and overseas. StatSoft's training classes provide hands-on experience with its line of software products as well as an introduction to real-world example applications.
StatSoft, through its Technical Services group, provides software validation services as part of the deployment of Statistica applications. These services include requirement gathering and documentation, validation planning, installation qualification, operational qualification, and performance qualification.

StatSoft also freely provides the Electronic Statistics Textbook.

Support for European countries in crisis
In October 2012 StatSoft announced that it would make its Statistica Enterprise Software available for free to companies in Greece, Portugal and Spain. This included StatSoft's Big Data Analytics Platform. StatSoft's stated aim was to help boost these country's productivity and competitiveness, and to facilitate their recovery. StatSoft CEO, Paul Lewicki, has written an open letter to the CEOs of US software companies urging them to join this “Free Enterprise Software for Struggling European Economies” initiative.

References

Software companies established in 1984
Software companies based in Oklahoma
Companies based in Tulsa, Oklahoma
Software companies of the United States